The Ministry of the Interior of Uruguay is the ministry of the Government of Uruguay that is responsible for controlling, regulating and evaluating policies, programs and plans related to public safety, as well as guaranteeing citizens the free exercise of fundamental rights and freedoms.

This ministry is in charge of the Uruguayan police force, as well as the fire department. In addition, it is responsible for issuing the identity card and other documents, through the National Directorate of Civil Identification. This government department is headquartered in Mercedes Road in Barrio Centro, Montevideo. The current Minister of the Interior is Luis Alberto Heber, who has held the position since May 25, 2021.

Creation 
It was created during the Provisional Government of José Rondeau on 22 December 1828 as the Ministry of Government and Foreign Affairs, but in 1856 it was divided to give rise to the Ministry of Foreign Affairs and the Ministry of Government. In 1943 it is finally renamed as Ministry of Interior.

Units of the Ministry of Interior 

 Dirección Nacional de Asuntos Internos: National Internal Affairs Directorate
 Dirección Nacional de Identificación Civil: National Directorate of Civil Identification
 Dirección Nacional de la Educación Policial: National Directorate of Police Education
 Dirección Nacional de Bomberos: National Fire Department
 Dirección Nacional de la Guardia Republicana: National Directorate of the Republican Guard
 Dirección General de Información e Inteligencia Policial: General Directorate of Information and Police Intelligence
 Dirección Nacional del Liberado: National Directorate of the Liberado
 Dirección Nacional de Asuntos Sociales: National Directorate of Social Affairs
 Dirección de Convivencia y Seguridad Ciudadana: Direction of Coexistence and Citizen Security
 Instituto Nacional de Rehabilitación: National Institute of Rehabilitation

Security Cabinet 
The Ministry's Security Cabinet has as its main mission the coordination and articulation of actions related to the conservation of order and public safety.

This cabinet is chaired by the Minister of the Interior and is composed, by the Undersecretary, the Director General of the Secretariat, the Director of the National Police, the Director of the Republican Guard, the Chief of Police of Montevideo, the Chief of Police of Canelones, the General Director of Information and Police Intelligence, the General Director of Repression of Illicit Drug Trafficking and the General Director of Combating Organized Crime and Interpol.

List of Ministers of the Interior 

List of Minister for the Interior of Uruguay since 1943:

References

External links 
 Uruguayan Ministry of Interior (in Spanish only)

Government ministries of Uruguay
 
Interior
Uruguay